Nam Ching Basketball is a Hong Kong men's basketball team of the South China Athletic Association (SCAA). The basketball section of the club had their first team known as just South China, while the second team Nam Ching, was the transliteration of South [China] Youth. Nam Ching competes in Hong Kong A1 Division Championship.

History

Nam Ching Basketball is a team of South China Athletic Association.

The team avoided relegation in December 1977, by winning Citizen.

In 2014 the team promoted again from 2014 Hong Kong A2 Division to 2015 Hong Kong A1 Division. The team avoided relegation in 2015 season.

The team were struggled to win in 2017 season. The team made their first win on 20 June 2017.

Honours
 Hong Kong A2 Division Championship
1976, 1980, 1986, 2014

References

External links
 

South China AA
Basketball teams in Hong Kong